Teresa Budzisz-Krzyżanowska (born 17 September 1942) is a Polish stage and film actress. She appeared in more than forty films since 1972.

She has performed at the Bagatela Theatre in Kraków, Juliusz Słowacki Theatre in Kraków, National Helena Modrzejewska Old Theatre in Kraków, Studio Theatre in Warszawa and  National Theatre in Warszawa.

Selected filmography

Awards and honours
 2005 - Gold Medal for Merit to Culture - Gloria Artis 
 2014 - Wielki Splendor (Polish Radio Theatre Award)

References

External links
 
Biography at the Culture.pl  

1942 births
Living people
People from Tczew
Polish stage actresses
Polish film actresses